Fakhraddin Valiyaddin oglu Najafov (31 March 1967, Baku, Azerbaijan SSR - 4 September 1992, Çıldıran, Aghdara District, Azerbaijan) was a National Hero of Azerbaijan and warrior during the First Nagorno-Karabakh War.

Early life and education 
Najafov was born on 31 March 1967 in Baku, Azerbaijan SSR. In 1984, he completed his secondary education at the Secondary School No. 19 in Baku. From 1985 through 1987, Najafov served in the Soviet Armed Forces.

First Nagorno-Karabakh war 
When Armenians attacked the territories of Azerbaijan, he voluntarily went to the front-line. In 1992, Najafov was appointed the commander of one of the military units in Agdam. On September 4, 1992, he was killed in a heavy battle around the village of Chyldyran of Aghdara Rayon of Azerbaijan.

Honors 
Anvar Talish oglu Arazov was posthumously awarded the title "National Hero of Azerbaijan" by Presidential Decree dated 6 November 1992. 

He was buried at a Martyrs' Lane cemetery in Baku. The secondary school No. 266 in Baku is named after him.

See also 
 First Nagorno-Karabakh War
 List of National Heroes of Azerbaijan

References

Sources 
Vugar Asgarov. Azərbaycanın Milli Qəhrəmanları (Yenidən işlənmiş II nəşr). Bakı: "Dərələyəz-M", 2010, səh. 224.

1967 births
1992 deaths
Military personnel from Baku
Azerbaijani military personnel of the Nagorno-Karabakh War
Azerbaijani military personnel killed in action
National Heroes of Azerbaijan